Aliyen Habib Kentaui (born 1954, in Smara, Western Sahara) is the Polisario Front representative for Sweden.

Diplomatic postings
Prior to 1995, Kentaui was the Sahrawi Arab Democratic Republic (SADR) ambassador for India for some years. He was then appointed as SADR ambassador for Ethiopia and permanent representative to the Organization for African Unity until 2000, when he was replaced by Mohamed Fadel Ismail Ould Es-Sweyih. That year he was accredited as SADR ambassador for Nigeria, presenting his credentials to Nigerian president Olusegun Obasanjo in 2001. He stayed in that post until 2008, after being elected as Wali (Governor) of the Wilaya of Ausserd, at the Sahrawi refugee camps in Tindouf, Algeria. In January 2012, he replaced Brahim Mojtar as POLISARIO Representative for Sweden.

References

People from Smara
Living people
1954 births
Polisario Front politicians
Ambassadors of the Sahrawi Arab Democratic Republic to Ethiopia
Ambassadors of the Sahrawi Arab Democratic Republic to India
Ambassadors of the Sahrawi Arab Democratic Republic to Nigeria
Sahrawi Sunni Muslims